Litchfield County is in northwestern Connecticut. As of the 2020 census, the population was 185,186. The county was named after Lichfield, in England. Litchfield County has the lowest population density of any county in Connecticut and is the state's largest county by area.

Litchfield County comprises the Torrington, CT, Micropolitan Statistical Area, which is included in the New York–Newark, NY–NJ–CT–PA, Combined Statistical Area.

As is the case with the other seven Connecticut counties, there is no county government and no county seat. Each town is responsible for all local services such as schools, snow removal, sewers, and fire and police departments. However, in some cases in rural areas, adjoining towns may agree to jointly provide services or even establish a regional school system.

History
Litchfield County was created on October 9, 1751, by an act of the Connecticut General Court from land belonging to Fairfield, New Haven, and Hartford counties. The act establishing the county states:
That the townships of Litchfield, Woodbury, New Milford, Harwinton, New Hartford, Barkhempstead, Hartland, Colebrook, Norfolk, Canaan, Salisbury, Kent, Sharon, Cornwall, Goshen, Torrington, and Winchester, lying in the northwesterly part of this Colony, shall be and remain one entire county, and be called the County of Litchfield, and shall have and exercise the same powers,  and authorities, and be subject to the same regulations, as the other counties in this Colony by law have and are subject unto. The bounds of which county shall extend north to the Colony line, and west to the
Colony line till it meets with the township of New Fairfield, and to include the towns abovementioned.

Between 1780 and 1807, several new towns were created at the boundaries between Litchfield County and other counties in Connecticut. The town of Watertown was established in 1780 from Waterbury and was placed under Litchfield County jurisdiction. The establishment of the town of Brookfield from part of New Milford in 1788 resulted in Litchfield County losing territory to Fairfield County. In 1796, the town of Hartland was transferred to Hartford County. In 1798, the town of Oxford was established from part of Southbury causing Litchfield County to lose territory to New Haven County. In 1807, the town of Southbury was transferred to New Haven County. The final boundary change occurred on October 8, 1807, when the town of Middlebury was established from part of Woodbury.

In 1862, during the Civil War, Litchfield County raised the 2nd Connecticut Regiment of Volunteers Heavy Artillery. This regiment, originally the 19th Connecticut Volunteer Infantry, served in the defense of Washington, D.C. from September 1862 to March 1864, at which time it was transferred to the Army of the Potomac. On June 1, 1864, the 2nd Connecticut Heavy Artillery fought as infantry (as it continued to do through the war) in the Battle of Cold Harbor, experiencing the heaviest proportionate losses of any Connecticut regiment in the Civil War. The regiment remained active to the end of the war, and its final mustering out September 5, 1865.

Geography
It is the largest county in Connecticut by area. Litchfield County is roughly contiguous with the portion of the Appalachian Mountains range known as the Berkshire Mountains (sometimes locally, this area is called the Litchfield Hills).

Adjacent counties
Berkshire County, Massachusetts (north)
Hampden County, Massachusetts (northeast)
Hartford County (east)
New Haven County (southeast)
Fairfield County (south)
Dutchess County, New York (west)

Demographics

2000 census
As of the census of 2000, there were 182,193 people, 71,551 households, and 49,584 families residing in the county. The racial makeup of the county was 95.77% White, 1.10% Black or African American, 0.18% Native American, 1.17% Asian, 0.02% Pacific Islander, 0.68% from other races, and 1.09% from two or more races.  2.14% of the population were Hispanic or Latino of any race. 20.8% were of Italian, 14.8% Irish, 10.6% English, 9.2% German and 6.3% French ancestry. 92.3% spoke English, 2.1% Spanish, 1.6% Italian and 1.2% French as their first language.

There were 71,551 households, out of which 32.10% had children under the age of 18 living with them, 57.20% were married couples living together, 8.60% had a female householder with no husband present, and 30.70% were non-families. 25.30% of all households were made up of individuals, and 10.20% had someone living alone who was 65 years of age or older.  The average household size was 2.51 and the average family size was 3.03.

In the county, the population was spread out, with 24.60% under the age of 18, 5.70% from 18 to 24, 29.80% from 25 to 44, 25.70% from 45 to 64, and 14.20% who were 65 years of age or older.  The median age was 40 years. For every 100 females, there were 95.60 males.  For every 100 females age 18 and over, there were 92.50 males.

The median income for a household in the county was $56,273, and the median income for a family was $66,445 (these figures had risen to $67,591 and $81,752 respectively as of a 2007 estimate). Males had a median income of $45,586 versus $31,870 for females. The per capita income for the county was $28,408.  About 2.70% of families and 4.50% of the population were below the poverty line, including 4.30% of those under age 18 and 5.40% of those age 65 or over.

2010 census
As of the 2010 United States census, there were 189,927 people, 76,640 households, and 51,530 families residing in the county. The racial makeup of the county was 93.9% white, 1.5% Asian, 1.3% black or African American, 0.2% American Indian, 1.4% from other races, and 1.6% from two or more races. Those of Hispanic or Latino origin made up 4.5% of the population. In terms of ancestry, 23.0% were Italian, 21.3% were Irish, 14.8% were English, 14.5% were German, 8.3% were Polish, and 3.3% were American.

Of the 76,640 households, 29.9% had children under the age of 18 living with them, 53.7% were married couples living together, 9.4% had a female householder with no husband present, 32.8% were non-families, and 26.6% of all households were made up of individuals. The average household size was 2.44 and the average family size was 2.97. The median age was 44.4 years.

The median income for a household in the county was $69,639 and the median income for a family was $84,890. Males had a median income of $57,362 versus $42,729 for females. The per capita income for the county was $35,848. About 3.6% of families and 5.8% of the population were below the poverty line, including 6.9% of those under age 18 and 4.6% of those age 65 or over.

Demographic breakdown by town

Income

Data is from the 2010 United States Census and the 2006-2010 American Community Survey 5-Year Estimates.

Race
Data is from the 2007-2011 American Community Survey 5-Year Estimates, ACS Demographic and Housing Estimates, "Race alone or in combination with one or more other races."

Politics
Litchfield County has voted for Republican presidential candidates more often than the rest of the state. In 2004 Bush won 51% to Kerry's 46%, making Litchfield the only county in southern New England that Bush carried. Litchfield was one of two Connecticut counties won by George H. W. Bush in 1992. But in 2008, no county in Connecticut, including Litchfield, was won by Republican candidate John McCain. The county also went for the Democratic presidential candidate in 1964, 1996, and 2000. In 2012 it was the only county won by Mitt Romney in the state. In 2016, Donald Trump won the county. Trump won the county again in 2020.

|}

Transportation
Litchfield is served by the Northwestern Connecticut Transit District.

Communities

Boroughs are incorporated portions of one or more towns with separate borough councils, zoning boards, and borough officials. Villages are named localities, but have no separate corporate existence from the towns they are in.

City
Torrington

Towns

Barkhamsted
Pleasant Valley
Riverton
Bethlehem
Bethlehem Village
Bridgewater
Canaan
Falls Village
Colebrook
Cornwall
Cornwall
Cornwall Bridge
West Cornwall
Goshen
West Goshen
Harwinton
Northwest Harwinton
Kent
Flanders
South Kent
Litchfield
Bantam
East Litchfield
Northfield
Morris
New Hartford
New Hartford Center
Pine Meadow
New Milford
Chimney Point
Erickson Corner
Gaylordsville
New Milford
Norfolk
North Canaan
Plymouth
East Plymouth
Terryville
Roxbury
Salisbury
Lakeville
Lime Rock
Sharon
Sharon
Sharon Valley
Thomaston
Warren
Washington
New Preston
Watertown
Oakville
Winchester
Winsted
Woodbury
Hotchkissville
Neufa
Woodbury Center

Telephone area codes
All areas of the county are in area code 860 except for the towns of Woodbury, Bethlehem and a small part of Roxbury, which are in the area code 203/area code 475 overlay. The geographical Woodbury Telephone Exchange (of the now defunct Woodbury Telephone Company) serves the two towns as well as the town of Southbury, which is in New Haven County and the small part of Roxbury. Ten digit dialing took effect for both area codes on November 14, 2009, as a result of the 203/475 overlay and the planned but not implemented 860/959 overlay.

Attractions
 Abbey of Regina Laudis
 Appalachian Trail in Connecticut
 Bash Bish Falls State Park - nearby in Massachusetts
 Kent Falls State Park
 Litchfield Historic District
 Mohawk Mountain Ski Area
 West Cornwall Covered Bridge

Education
School districts in the county follow municipal boundaries.

Full K-12: 

 Litchfield School District
 New Milford School District
 Plymouth School District
 Regional School District 06
 Regional School District 10
 Regional School District 12
 Regional School District 14
 Thomaston School District
 Torrington School District
 Watertown School District
 Winchester School District

Secondary:
 Regional High School District 01
 Regional High School District 07

Elementary only: 

 Barkhamsted School District
 Canaan School District
 Colebrook School District
 Cornwall School District
 Kent School District
 New Hartford School District
 Norfolk School District
 North Canaan School District
 Salisbury School District
 Sharon School District

There is also a privately endowed publicly funded secondary school, Gilbert School.

See also

 Kent Hollow, Connecticut
 Litchfield Hills
National Register of Historic Places listings in Litchfield County, Connecticut
 Torrington Titans Litchfield County's summer collegiate baseball team who play at Fuessenich Park in downtown Torrington.
 Wildcat Hollow, Connecticut

References

 

 
1751 establishments in Connecticut
1960 disestablishments in Connecticut
Counties in the New York metropolitan area
Populated places established in 1751
Micropolitan areas of Connecticut